The 2006 UIM F1 World Championship was the 23rd season of Formula 1 Powerboat racing. The calendar consisted of six events, beginning in Doha, Qatar on 15 April 2006, and ending in Sharjah, UAE on 15 December 2006. Scott Gillman, driving for the Emirates F1 Team, clinched his fourth and ultimately last F1 championship which remains the second highest total in the sport's history.

Teams and drivers

Season calendar

A six-race calendar was maintained from the 2005 season, with just one change: the incident-packed race from the previous year in Singapore was replaced by the return of China to the schedule after a year's absence. The venue chosen was Chongzhou where F1 would visit for the first time. The 2006 season marked a watershed for Italy's presence in the sport. Whilst Italian teams and drivers have gone on to participate in the series for years to follow, 2006 is the last time an Italian round has featured on the calendar to date. It was therefore somewhat fitting that on the 25th anniversary of the first championship season the venue was Lake Como where the first F1 race, and the first Grand Prix of Italy, had been held in 1981.

Results and standings
Points were awarded to the top 10 classified finishers. A maximum of two boats per team were eligible for points in the teams' championship.

Drivers standings

Teams standings
Only boats with results eligible for points counting towards the teams' championship are shown here.

References

External links
 The official website of the UIM F1 H2O World Championship
 The official website of the Union Internationale Motonautique

F1 Powerboat World Championship
Formula 1 Powerboat seasons
F1 Powerboat World Championship